"House Work"  is a song by English DJ and record producer Jax Jones featuring vocals from Mike Dunn and British singer MNEK. The song was released as a digital download on 1 July 2016, through Polydor Records in the United Kingdom. The song has peaked at number 85 on the UK Singles Chart. The single cover is Jones' first to resemble everyday commercial products, in this case the cover resembles a bottle of washing up liquid.

Music video
The official music video to accompany the release of "House Work" was first released onto YouTube on 30 August 2016 at a total length of two minutes and forty-five seconds. A video was released featuring a live mix of the song. The video features a fictional infomercial for a product called "House Work" (the bottle of liquid is the same as the one on the single's cover). A visualiser/official audio using the extended version of the song was released on the 1 July, 2016, which  depicted a cartoon version of the main artist, Jax Jones dancing on the bottle of liquid. The video reached a total length of five minutes.

The video also features big brother contestant and model Chanelle Hayes.

Track listing

Charts

Weekly charts

Release history

References

2016 songs
2016 singles
Jax Jones songs
MNEK songs
Polydor Records singles
Songs written by Jax Jones
Songs written by MNEK
Song recordings produced by Jax Jones